DJ-Kicks: Peggy Gou is a DJ mix album, mixed by South Korean DJ and producer Peggy Gou. It was released in June 2019 under the Studio !K7 independent record label as part of their DJ-Kicks series.

The album became her first Billboard chart appearance, reaching 9th in Dance/Electronic Album Sales, and the second compilation that ever got into the top 10 after Moodymann's.

Critical reception

At Metacritic, which assigns a normalized rating out of 100 to reviews from mainstream publications, DJ-Kicks: Peggy Gou received an average score of 78, based on 5 reviews, indicating "generally favorable reviews".

Steph Lee of Resident Advisor gave the album a mixed review, writing, "Gou's DJ-Kicks, though filled with some stretches of sleek club music, struggles to find an overall thread to hold it together. The personal angle is not enough. Each of these tunes may hold a special significance in Gou's life. But to the listener, they don't quite reveal the story."

Track listing

Charts

References

2019 compilation albums
DJ-Kicks albums
Peggy Gou albums